Eaglehead Mountain is located in the Lewis Range, Glacier National Park in the U.S. state of Montana. Buffalo Woman Lake is east of the peak.

See also
 Mountains and mountain ranges of Glacier National Park (U.S.)

References

Mountains of Flathead County, Montana
Eaglehead
Lewis Range
Mountains of Montana